Olompali may refer to:
Battle of Olompali
Olompali, California
Olompali State Historic Park
Rancho Olompali